Margaret Walker (1915–1998) was an American poet and writer. 

Margaret Walker may also refer to:

Margaret Walker (athlete) (born 1925), British sprinter
Margaret Sellers Walker (1935–2020), American city and state official
Margaret Urban Walker (born 1948), American philosopher
Margaret Walker (EastEnders), a fictional character on the British soap opera played by Susan George
Margaret Walker (speech therapist)

See also 
Maggie L. Walker (1864–1934), American teacher and businesswoman